Aortocaval compression syndrome is compression of the abdominal aorta and inferior vena cava by the gravid uterus when a pregnant woman lies on her back, i.e. in the supine position. It is a frequent cause of low maternal blood pressure (hypotension), which can result in loss of consciousness and in extreme circumstances fetal demise.

Aortocaval compression is thought to be the cause of supine hypotensive syndrome. Supine hypotensive syndrome  is characterized by pallor, tachycardia, sweating, nausea, hypotension and dizziness and occurs when a pregnant woman lies on her back and resolves when she is turned on her side. Medical management of supine hypotensive syndrome can include turning the patient to the left recumbent position (so the uterus is not sitting on the IVC) and administering IV fluids.

The aorta and inferior vena cava are central vessels, the largest artery and vein. They supply blood to the heart, and the rest of the body. Thus, when there is compression due to the weight of the fetus, signs of shock (sweating, pallor, fast and weak pulse) may be experienced. Patients should be placed in a left lateral recumbent position and emergency help summoned immediately.

See also
Inferior vena cava syndrome

References

Syndromes
Pathology of pregnancy, childbirth and the puerperium
Anesthesia